The Tosan, sometimes reported as the Tosan-1, is an Iranian SACLOS wire-guided anti-tank missile. It is a copy of the 9M113 Konkurs.

It's currently manufactured by Aerospace Industries Organization.

History
The Tosan was licensed by Iran in 1991 from Russia. Its production reportedly started in January 2000 with the inauguration of its production line. In February 2013, the Tosan was deployed in war games by the IRGC in Kerman.

In the Houthi insurgency, the Tosan's been used in the Saudi Arabian–led intervention in Yemen against Saudi-led armored vehicles. In 2016, UAE troops secured a Tosan taken from a Houthi base in Safir, Marib Governorate in Yemen. In November 2018, a Tosan was publicly shown to reporters, which was taken by Saudi troops as evidence of Iranian support to Houthi forces.

The Tosan is said to be deployed in Iranian border areas in 2018.

Design
The Tosan is armed with two warheads at a distance of 75 meters after firing from a missile launcher and can destroy any target at long distances.

The missile weights 26.5 kg, with 3.2 kg from the warhead. Its range is between 70 and 4000 meters; its maximum speed is 200 meters per second, its probability of hitting the target is 95% and its penetration rate in the armor depth is up to 670 mm. 

The missile range decreases to 2,500 meters at night.

In 2018, it's reported that the Tosan can have the “RU244TK” and “RU150TK” thermal imaging cameras attached.

Operators

Non-State Actors
 Houthis: These are used by the Houthis, supplied by the Islamic Revolutionary Guard Corps.

References 

Post–Cold War weapons of Iran
Anti-tank guided missiles of Iran